Caryocar coriaceum is a species of plant in the Caryocaraceae family. It is endemic to Brazil.

References

coriaceum
Endangered plants
Endemic flora of Brazil
Taxonomy articles created by Polbot
Plants described in 1886